Herbert James Cain (December 24, 1912 – February 23, 1982) was a Canadian professional ice hockey left winger who played 13 seasons in the National Hockey League (NHL) for the Montreal Maroons, Montreal Canadiens, and Boston Bruins between 1933 and 1946.

Early life
Cain was born in Newmarket, Ontario to John (Jack) and Elizabeth "Eliza" Cain (née Currier). He started to develop his skills on "the pond" now known as Fairy Lake, with Liberty Magazines for shin guards. One year his team from St John's Separate School counted 56 goals. Herb Cain netted every one of them.

He played Junior A hockey in Newmarket and Hamilton. Cain's future as an NHL great was foreshadowed in 1931 playing for the Newmarket Redman. Just turned 20, he scored 11 goals in six playoff games.

Early playing career
Cain launched his NHL career with the Montreal Maroons for part of the 1933–34 season. One version of how he became a Maroon from Boston sportswriter Bill Grimes is that the Maroon scout had gone to Windsor  to evaluate the play of Toe Blake, but he picked Herb Cain over Blake, who remained a live-long friend of Cain. Another version from Cain's family is that the scout picked both of them.

As a member of the Maroons, Cain played on a line with Gus Marker and Bob Gracie.  They were dubbed the "Green Line" and their combined offensive skills led to the teams' second Stanley Cup Championship in 1934–35. In his first full season, as a 22-year-old NHL rookie, Cain scored a team leading 20 goals in 44 games. This placed him 8th in NHL goal scoring for 1934-35—as a rookie.

After the Montreal Maroons folded during the Great Depression, Cain was dealt to the Montreal Canadiens in the fall of 1938. In his one season with the Habs, or the "French" as some Boston sportswriters called them, Cain stood second in goal scoring (13) behind Toe Blake (24). This was before Montreal became a powerhouse and in 1938–39, they finished 6th of 7 teams in season play. Montreal notching only 39 points that year against Boston's 74; eventually Boston won the Stanley Cup.

Herb Cain becomes a Bruin in 1939 
At the beginning of the 1939–40 season, it has been reported that Cain was a holdout in the Montreal Canadiens' training camp,  bargaining for a better salary. Montreal traded him to the Boston Bruins for Charlie Sands and Ray Getliffe.  Cain played his first game for the Bruins in Toronto on November 4, without ever practicing with his new team. The Bruins lost that first game of their season 5-0 but finished first in the league on the season. That year Schmidt and Dumart led the Bruins goal scoring with 22 goals each. Cain was third in Bruins goal scoring with 21, tied with Bobby Bauer and Cain fired seven game winners, Cain's 21 goals in 1939–40, also tied him with Hall of Fame inductee Gordie Drillon for 4th place in goal scoring in the entire league. Remarkably, that year only 5 players scored 20 goals or more. Four wore bold Bs on their sweaters. Clearly, Cain had joined a winning organization, crafted by Art Ross  who has hammered together America's first team, the Boston Bruins in 1924. 

With the Second World War continuing into 1941, Canadian authorities threatened to prohibit single men between the ages of 21 and 25 from working in the US; nearly all hockey players in the US were Canadian. Cain turned 29 in 1941 and he was married so he was free to make his living in the USA but the younger Milt Schmidt and Woody Dumart enlisted with the Canadian air force, potentially breaking up the Bruins' famous Kraut Line of Schmidt, Dumart and Bauer. These three, all from Kitchener, Ontario, had been friends since adolescence, and were fan favorites, leading Stanley Cup victories in 1939 and 1941 and finishing one-two-three in NHL scoring in 1939–40: Schmidt with 52 points and Bauer and Dumart tied with 43 points.

In spite of their initial military call-up, the Krauts played the entire 1940–41 season but their future with the Bruins and even the Bruins future was uncertain. Cain who was injured, missed nine games and finished the 1940–41 season with just 8 goals and 10 assists.  In the playoffs, however, with 2 goals and 3 assists, he was 6th in Bruin scoring and helped to win the Stanley Cup in 1941.

In 1941–42, Cain again notched 8 goals and 10 assists when he missed 15 games due to injuries. In 1942, more hockey players were joining the war effort. In all 10 eventual Hall of Fame forwards from Herb Cain's era, players Cain faced-off against, served in WWII. Boston lost its entire first line when the Krauts enlisted. On February 10, 1942, Montreal Canadiens and Boston players, arch enemies during the match, hoisted the "Krauts" to their shoulders and skated them around the Boston Garden celebrating, for they were doing their patriotic duty, which in large part meant being physical education instructors and playing hockey for military teams.

With the Kraut Line out of the NHL, left-winger Herb Cain, centre Bill Crowley and right wingers, including Art Jackson, became Boston's first line. In 1942–43, Cain missed 5 games due to injuries but managed to score 18 goals and add 18 assists. During the season Cain was 5th in Bruins goal scoring, well behind Bill Crowley's 27 markers. Also, Cain was 22nd in the league in goal scoring. In the playoffs, Cain was second in Boston goal scoring with 4 in 7 games, behind Art Jackson who had 6 markers in 9 games.

Cain wins the NHL scoring championship in 1944 
In 1943–44, Cain had his most productive year of his hockey career playing on a line with future Hall of Fame inductee Bill Cowley, and often with Art Jackson, brother of Busher Jackson, a hall of famer. Sometimes Cain played on a line with right-winger Buzz Boll, who said of him, "He's so fast that he beats me to all of those loose pucks in front of the cage." Cain won the NHL scoring title in 1943–44 with 82 points, in 49 games, thereby setting a record for points in a season. This new record was 9 more than the old one held by Doug Bentley (1943) and Cooney Weiland (1930).  In 1944 Cain was also selected as a Second Team All-Star at left wing, and with only 4 minutes in penalties he was runner up to Clint Smith of the Chicago Black Hawks, who also served 4 minutes in penalties, for the Lady Byng Trophy.

Herbie Cain's scoring record of 82 points stood until Gordie Howe scored 86 in 1950–51. Howe set the new record—of just four more points—in a 70-game season—21 more games than Cain played in 1943–44.

From first in scoring in 1943–44, in 1944- 45 he fell to 13th place in overall scoring although he was second in goals to Rocket Richard who blasted 50. In the playoffs in 1945, Cain led his team in scoring with 5 goals and 2 assists in 7 games. The next season, 1945–46, Cain's scoring dipped to 17 goals, and 12 assists, still placing him 18th in goal scoring, ahead of Edgar LaParade, Harry Watson, Elmer Lach, Milt Schmidt, Sweeney Shriner and even Bill Cowley and several others, all, who eventually joined the Hockey Hall of Fame. In 1945–46, the NHL had implemented a one assist rule and although it was not always followed assiduously, assists were down 30% in the league over the previous year and this might account in part for Cain's low assist total; although throughout his 13-year NHL career, he counted more goals than assists four times.

AHL play
In 1946–47 Cain was sent to the Bears of the American Hockey League (AHL). In four seasons, he scored 92 goals, and helped the Bears win their first Calder Cup.  Near the end of his fourth season he had a serious injury.  Driving home to Newmarket from Pennsylvania at the end of the season with his leg in a cast, he decided to retire from professional hockey at age 35.

Cain claimed he was blackballed by Art Ross the fiery manager of the Bruins because he asked for a raise. In Brian McFarlane's book, The Bruins, Cain is quoted as saying that in 1946 the New York Rangers and the Chicago Blackhawks were eager to acquire his services. Cain's daughter Colleen corroborates McFarlane's reporting.

Hockey Hall of Fame 
When a benefit was held to raise money for his cancer treatment in the 1960s, members of the NHL hockey squad sent Cain a telegram indicating that he had been nominated to the Hockey Hall of Fame.  To date, Herb Cain remains the only NHL scoring  champion who is not in the Hockey Hall of Fame.

Personal life
Cain devoted himself to Newmarket, his wife Shirley and their children, Terry and Colleen, who claims she was skating at two. Herb coached the Junior C team, the Newmarket Smokies and they won the Ontario championship in 1956, '58 and '59.

In 1964 when Cain was diagnosed with Hodgkin's lymphoma. Doctors at Toronto's Princess Margaret Hospital prescribed chemotherapy. He was expected to die but lived another 17 years.

Awards and achievements
 1943–44 NHL Scoring Leader
 1943–44 NHL Second Team All-Star - Left Wing

Records
1943–44 - Set NHL record for most points in a season with 82

Career statistics

See also
 Notable families in the NHL

References

External links

Herb Cain photos on the Web

1912 births
1982 deaths
Boston Bruins players
Canadian ice hockey left wingers
Hershey Bears players
Ice hockey people from Ontario
Montreal Canadiens players
Montreal Maroons players
National Hockey League All-Stars
National Hockey League scoring leaders (prior to 1947–48)
Sportspeople from Newmarket, Ontario
Stanley Cup champions